Diatraea impersonatellus is a moth in the family Crambidae. It was described by Francis Walker in 1863. It is found in Guyana, Brazil and Venezuela.

References

Chiloini
Moths described in 1863